Toni Braxton: Revealed was a residency show by  American singer Toni Braxton. It was performed at The Showroom at the Flamingo Las Vegas until the announcement of its cancellation on April 6, 2008.

Background and development

On May 19, 2006, the Flamingo Hotel and Casino in Las Vegas announced that Braxton would replace Wayne Newton as the casino's new headlining act from December 3, 2006. The show, entitled Toni Braxton: Revealed, was to be performed six nights a week and was scheduled to run through to March 2007. Braxton later confirmed that she was extending her show through to August 2007. Due to its success, it was reported that Braxton would extend her show through to August 2010. The show was later cancelled in order for Braxton to focus on her health. The production featured nine dancers with intricate choreography, along with a specially designed set with a 9' x 16' LED screen and elaborate costumes. In an October 2006 concert, Braxton broke down in tears while announcing to the audience that just before the concert began she had been told that her son, Diezel, had been diagnosed with autism. Braxton has been outspoken regarding her doctor's failure to diagnose Diezel's condition earlier, contending that if he had been diagnosed earlier he could have received treatment earlier. As well as becoming a spokeswoman for Autism Speaks.

Reception 
Mike Weatherford of the Las Vegas Review-Journal gave the show a mixed review, complaining about "the anticlimactic treatment of her best-known songs. They just don’t have the resonance they should." But he favorably compared the show to Celine Dion's Las Vegas engagement, saying, "Amid all the hoopla surrounding Celine Dion’s final shows last weekend, Las Vegas’ other working pop-star mom forged on with 'Revealed,' a revue that runs on a fraction of the budget of 'A New Day …' but likewise has become a smoother, more graceful showcase over time."

Set list 
This set list is representative of the performance on August 3, 2006. It does not represent all concerts for the duration of the residency.
"You're Makin' Me High"
"Take This Ring"
"How Many Ways"
"Love Shoulda Brought You Home"
"Another Sad Love Song"
"You Mean the World to Me"
"Seven Whole Days"
"Just Be a Man About It"
"I Love Me Some Him"
"I Don't Want To"
"How Could an Angel Break My Heart"
"Please"
"Spanish Guitar"
"I Wanna Be (Your Baby)"
"Trippin' (That's the Way Love Works)"
"Let It Flow"
"Breathe Again"
"He Wasn't Man Enough"
"Un-Break My Heart"
Note: The setlist may have changed their order as they advanced the dates.

Shows

Cancelled shows

References

Toni Braxton concert tours
2006 concert residencies
2007 concert residencies
2008 concert residencies
Concert residencies in the Las Vegas Valley